Heorogar was a Danish king who appears in the Old English poem Beowulf as the eldest son of Healfdene (Halfdan), and the brother of Hroðgar (Hroar), and Halga (Helgi). The people in parentheses are personages found also in Norse sources.

He is mentioned in lines 2155-2165 of the poem, when King Hrothgar gives Beowulf the armour and weapons that originally belonged to King Heorogar:

"Me ðis hildesceorp         Hroðgar sealde, 
snotra fengel,         sume worde het 
þæt ic his ærest ðe         est gesægde; 
cwæð þæt hyt hæfde         *Hiorogar cyning, 
leod Scyldunga         lange hwile; 

no ðy ær suna sinum         syllan wolde, 
hwatum Heorowearde,         þeah he him hold wære, 
breostgewædu.         Bruc ealles well!" 

Translation:
"Hrothgar did not leave Beowulf unsatisfied. Beowulf offered all of the treasures given to him to Hygelac his leader. Hygelac ordered in his boar standard, a suit of armour, and a sword given to him by Hrothgar who had received it from his brother *Heorogar and once promised to Heoroweard and gave it all to Beowulf to use well."

Unlike Halga, Hroðgar, Healfdene, and Heorogar's son Heoroweard, Heorogar does not appear in Norse sources. However, Heorogar may explain why Heoroweard (according to Norse sources) rebelled against Hroðulf (Hrólf Kraki) and killed him. As the son of Heorogar, the eldest of Healfdene's sons, Heoroweard had greater right to the Danish throne than Hroðulf.

References
Nerman, B. Det svenska rikets uppkomst. Stockholm, 1925. 
Olrik, (1903) Danmarks heltedigtning I, p. 39ff.
McMaster University, Canada: Beowulf Hypertext (http://www.humanities.mcmaster.ca/~beowulf/main.html)

Characters in Beowulf
English heroic legends